The Jones and Laughlin Steel Corporation began as the American Iron Company, founded in 1852 by Bernard Lauth and Benjamin Franklin Jones, a few miles (c 4 km) south of Pittsburgh along the Monongahela River.  Lauth's interest was bought in 1854 by James Laughlin.  The first firm to bear the name of Jones and Laughlin was organized in 1861 and headquartered at Third & Ross in downtown Pittsburgh.

History
Originally producing only iron, the enterprise began the production of steel in 1886.  Over the ensuing 60 years, the company expanded its facilities and its operations along both sides of the Monongahela River on the South Side of Pittsburgh and along the Ohio River at Aliquippa. The Hot Metal Bridge across the Monongahela River was built to connect Eliza blast furnaces (making pig iron) on the Hazelwood side of the river with the open hearth furnaces (making steel) on the south side of the river.  In 1905, a new plant was begun at Aliquippa, Pennsylvania. The company also owned coal mines in western Pennsylvania in its early days, including some reached by an incline in Pittsburgh's South Side which connected to the railroad over the bridge adjacent to the Hot Metal Bridge. Other mines were along the nearby Becks Run, also directly connected by railroad.  The incline and mines were gone before 1900, but mining continued in Pennsylvania towns such as Vestaburg and elsewhere.

On January 9, 1907, an explosion at the Eliza Furnace plant in the Soho district of Pittsburgh killed 13.  The coroner found that workers had left the gang in the preceding few days, fearing for their safety.

The former Otis Steel company along the Cuyahoga River in Cleveland was purchased in 1942, and then in the mid-1960s a finishing plant was constructed in Hennepin, Illinois.

Similar explosions to the 1907 incident took place in April and May 1942, the second one resulting in two fatalities.

J & L Steel (known to its employees as simply "J & L", sometimes pronounced "jane ell") provided the most able competition to the Carnegie Steel Company in the vicinity of Pittsburgh. J & L also had subsidiary mills in other cities such as Los Angeles in the late 1940s.  Ling-Temco-Vought, Inc. of Texas offered to purchase 63 percent of J & L Steel on May 10, 1968. An agreement was reached on May 14, and the purchase was completed for approximately $428.5 million ($ today) by June 1968.  It took full control of the company in 1974. As a result of the Steel Crisis and the 1973 Recession, the J & L mill in Los Angeles closed.

In 1978, J & L Steel (as a subsidiary of LTV) acquired Youngstown Sheet and Tube. In 1981, J & L Steel bought a stainless steel mill from McLouth Steel Products in Detroit, which was probably an attempt to try to get closer to the auto market. 

By the 1980s the LTV Conglomerate began to go into decline. In 1984, J & L was merged with Republic Steel and the name of Jones and Laughlin completely disappeared.

J&L Coal Incline

The J&L Coal Incline was a  incline in Pittsburgh, Pennsylvania connecting a coal mine to the J&L iron making facility.  It ran from Josephine Street, between South 29th street and South 30th Street on the lower end to Sumner Street on its upper end.
It was supplied with coal from the American Mine, opened in 1854.

From hot strip to mixed-use development
Dismantling of the buildings which housed J & L Steel produced an upsurge of building on the tracts of land where the buildings had stood. By September 2005, numerous new structures had been erected on both sides of the Monongahela River.  The Pittsburgh Technology Center now stands on the north side of the Monongahela River where the blast furnaces once stood and the SouthSide Works, a commercial and residential development, stands on the south side where milling operations occurred. The Hot Metal Bridge has been converted into a road bridge and a pedestrian/bike bridge (which forms part of the Great Allegheny Passage). On what was once Hazelwood Works of the J & L operations, another development, Hazelwood Green is now a 178-acre mixed-use riverfront redevelopment site. Hazelwood Green was purchased in 2002 by Almono LP and was officially opened to the public in April 2019 with the public dedication of new roads - Hazelwood Avenue and Blair Street extensions - through the site.  Mill 19, the last remaining structure from the Hazelwood Plant, is being refurbished to serve as a mixed use development including a robotics lab run by Carnegie Mellon University.

Historic sites
Jones & Laughlin Steel Co. is a builder of record for a number of bridges and other structures that are listed on the National Register of Historic Places.

Works include:
Big Blue River Bridge, Twp. Rd. over Big Blue R., 1 mi. SE of Surprise, Surprise, Nebraska (Jones & Laughlin Steel Co.), NRHP-listed
Brewer Bridge, Co. Rd. over the Niobrara R., 14.7 mi. E of Valentine, Valentine, Nebraska (Jones & Laughlin Steel Co.), NRHP-listed 
Hill Annex Mine, off US 169, Calumet, Minnesota (Jones & Laughlin Steel Co.), NRHP-listed
Nine Bridges Bridge, private rd. over Middle Channel of the Platte R., 3.9 mi. N of Doniphan, Doniphan, Nebraska (Jones & Laughlin Steel Co.), NRHP-listed
Prairie Dog Creek Bridge, Twp. Rd. over Prairie Dog Cr., 8.5 mi. S and 1 mi. W of Orleans. Orleans, Nebraska (Jones & Laughlin Steel Co.), NRHP-listed 
Southwest Fifth St. Bridge, SW Fifth St. over Raccoon R.. Des Moines, Iowa (Jones & Laughlin Steel Co., Killmar), NRHP-listed
Turkey Creek Bridge, Co. Rd. over Turkey Cr., 2 mi. W and 1 mi. S of Ragan, Ragan, Nebraska (Jones & Laughlin Steel Co.), NRHP-listed

See also
National Labor Relations Board v. Jones & Laughlin Steel Corporation
Youngstown Sheet & Tube Co. v. Sawyer
Interstate 180 (Illinois)

References

Further reading

Vukmir, Rade B. The Mill(2016). Sewickley, Pennsylvania: Dichotomy Press. .
 Vukmir, Rade B. The Mill(1999), University Press of America, Baltimore, MD, .
 The Mill(Revised Edition)(2016). Dichotomy Pres, Sewickley, PA. .

External links
Jones & Laughlin Steel Corporation Photographs, 1864-1953 online collection MSP #33 from the Library & Archives, Senator John Heinz History Center
Finding aid to the Jones & Laughlin Steel Corporation Historical Records at the Archives Service Center, University of Pittsburgh
Finding aid to the Jones & Laughlin Steel Corporation Pittsburgh Works Earnings Records at the Archives Service Center, University of Pittsburgh
Finding aid to the Jones & Laughlin Steel Corporation Records at the Archives Service Center, University of Pittsburgh
Finding aid to the Jones & Laughlin Steel Corporation Pittsburgh Works Records at the Archives Service Center, University of Pittsburgh
Finding aid to the Jones & Laughlin Steel Corporation Aliquippa Works Records at the Archives Service Center, University of Pittsburgh

Rolling mills
Steel companies of the United States
Railway inclines in Pittsburgh
Historic American Engineering Record in Pennsylvania
Bridge companies
Articles containing video clips
1852 establishments in Pennsylvania
Construction and civil engineering companies of the United States
Construction and civil engineering companies established in 1852
American companies established in 1852
Defunct manufacturing companies based in Pittsburgh